V. Karuppasamy Pandian is an Indian politician and a former Member of the Legislative Assembly in Tamil Nadu. He is currently one of the prominent leader of the anna Dravida Munnetra Kazhagam (ADMK) party in Tirunelveli district.

Career 
Pandian was a supporter of AIADMK founder and former Chief Minister, M. G. Ramachandran. Both Ramachandran and party general secretary Jayalalithaa appointed him to various party roles from 1972, culminating in him becoming deputy general secretary of the party in 1996.

Pandian was elected to the Tamil Nadu Legislative Assembly as an AIADMK candidate from Alangulam constituency in the 1977 elections. He was re-elected, this time from the Palayamkottai constituency, in the 1980 elections.

In 2000, Pandian was expelled from the AIADMK by Jayalalithaa. He joined the rival Dravida Munnetra Kazhagam (DMK) on 2 May 2000, was given various posts by that party and had hopes of obtaining a state-level post within it. In the 2006 elections, he was successful in contesting as a DMK candidate in the Tenkasi constituency.

After being suspended from the DMK in May 2015 after allegedly attempting to have his son appointed to an official post within the party, Pandian remained silent for a while before being readmitted to the AIADMK on 26 July 2016 by Jayalalithaa. He had frequently severely criticised Jayalalithaa during his DMK member but after his expulsion had heaped praised upon her. After her death in December 2016, V. K. Sassikala appointed him as one of the organising secretaries of the party. He resigned the post in February 2017 in protest against Sasikala's appointment of T. T. V. Dhinakaran as party deputy general secretary. He said, "I cannot digest the appointment of a person, who was removed from the party by Jayalalithaa in 2011 after branding him as 'traitor', as the deputy general secretary."

Electoral performance

References 

All India Anna Dravida Munnetra Kazhagam politicians
Dravida Munnetra Kazhagam politicians
Living people
Tamil Nadu MLAs 2006–2011
Year of birth missing (living people)